James Morton (22 August 1885 – 29 July 1926) was a Scottish professional footballer who played for Hibernian, Bradford City, Stoke City, Tottenham Hotspur, St Bernard's, Bathgate, Barnsley and Bristol City.

Career
After spells with Newtongrange Star, Hibernian, Bradford City and Stoke, Morton joined Tottenham Hotspur in 1908. The centre forward played twice for the Spurs. He re-joined Hibernian before playing for St Bernard's and Bathgate. In 1913 he joined Barnsley where he featured in 18 matches and scored three goals. Morton went on to sign for Bristol City where featured in a further 12 matches and netting seven times before ending his playing career.

After his playing career had ended he became a trainer at Nuneaton. Morton died at his home in Edinburgh on 29 July 1926 after a long illness.

Career statistics

References

External links
James Morton, www.ihibs.co.uk

1885 births
People from Leith
Scottish footballers
English Football League players
Hibernian F.C. players
Bradford City A.F.C. players
Stoke City F.C. players
Tottenham Hotspur F.C. players
Barnsley F.C. players
Bristol City F.C. players
1926 deaths
Scottish Football League players
Bathgate F.C. players
St Bernard's F.C. players
Association football forwards